Siam Center is a shopping center near Siam BTS station in Bangkok, Thailand.

History
Siam Center was built in 1973 as one of Bangkok's first shopping malls. It has undergone renovation several times, including after a fire in 1995. On 11 January 2013, Siam Center re-branded itself as Siam Center The Ideaopolis.

Siam Discovery

Siam Discovery is a shopping center located in the same complex as Siam Center. It is adjacent to Siam Center and was completed in 1997. The mall underwent a large scale refurbishment in 2016 designed by Nendo.

Awards and recognition
2013: Best Commercial Renovation/Redevelopment Thailand "Siam Discovery Renovation” from the Asia Pacific Property Award

See also
 List of shopping malls in Thailand

References

External links

Corporate website

Shopping malls in Bangkok
Pathum Wan district
Shopping malls established in 1973
1973 establishments in Thailand